Alexandra Dmitrievna Vasilieva (born 17 October 1995) is a Russian former competitive pair skater. With former partner Yuri Shevchuk, she is the 2011 Russian Junior silver medalist and placed 11th at the 2011 World Junior Championships. The pair began skating together in May 2008 and were coached by Artur Dmitriev in Saint Petersburg. In March 2012, it was confirmed that Vasilieva/Shevchuk had ended their partnership.

Programs 
(with Shevchuk)

Competitive highlights 
(with Shevchuk)

References

External links
 
 Alexandra Vasilieva at fskate.ru

Russian female pair skaters
1995 births
Living people
Figure skaters from Saint Petersburg